Samuel Bennion (1871 – 6 May 1941) was an English footballer, manager and later chairman of Port Vale.

Career
Bennion was a Burslem native and a Burslem Port Vale supporter from the club's inception. He served the club as an official, but made a full appearance in the English Football League as a left-back in a 2–2 draw at Lincoln City on 24 February 1894 when the club were a man down.

He later served as an emergency manager when Tommy Clare left the club in 1906, before the club folded at the end of the 1906–07 season. He was then involved as Cobridge Church F.C. changed their name to Port Vale and went on to serve as chairman of this new club from December 1908 to July 1911, when control was handed to the shareholders of a limited liability company. He was retained as a director however until 1933.

Career statistics
Source:

References

1871 births
1941 deaths
Sportspeople from Burslem
English footballers
Association football defenders
Port Vale F.C. players
English Football League players
Port Vale F.C. managers
Port Vale F.C. directors and chairmen
English football managers
English Football League managers